Israel–Somaliland relations refers to the relationship between the Republic of Somaliland and the State of Israel. The two countries have no formal diplomatic relations.

History 
Israel was one of 35 countries that recognised Somaliland's brief independence in 1960. In February 2010, Israeli Foreign Ministry spokesperson Yigal Palmor was quoted in the Haaretz Daily that his government was ready to recognise Somaliland again. Although, he stated that the Somaliland government has not contacted the Israeli government to seek ties.

In 1995, former President Egal of Somaliland also wrote a letter to Prime Minister Yitzhak Rabin seeking to establish diplomatic ties between the two countries. In September 2001, it was also reported Somaliland was looking towards Tel Aviv after Saudi Arabia banned imports of livestock from the country due to Rift Valley fever. During this time several Israeli businessmen were also in the nation's capital Hargeisa. However, President Kahin who succeeded Egal is reported to have avoided approaching Israel to prevent straining fragile relations with the Arabs and Muslim world, which it heavily relies on its livestock trade. In August 2020, Somaliland expressed its support for the Israel–United Arab Emirates normalization agreement.

See also 

 Foreign relations of Somaliland
 Foreign relations of Israel

References 

 
Israel
Somaliland